XV Brigade, Royal Horse Artillery was a brigade of the Royal Horse Artillery formed during World War I.  It served with 29th Division in the Gallipoli Campaign and on the Western Front.  It was disbanded after the war.

History

Duplicate numbering
Strangely, two Royal Horse Artillery brigades were formed early in World War I and simultaneously designated as XV Brigade, RHA.  The first was formed on 1 October 1914 for service with the 3rd Cavalry Division and commanded C, G and K Batteries, RHA.  It was renumbered as IV Brigade, RHA in May 1915.  The second was formed in January 1915 and is the subject of the current article.

Formation
XV Brigade, RHA was formed at Leamington, Warwickshire in January 1915 with:
 B Battery of I Brigade, RHA at Ambala, India
 L Battery at St John's Wood Barracks, reformed after the action at Néry
 Y Battery of XIII Brigade, RHA at Mhow, India
 XV RHA Brigade Ammunition Column
On formation, the batteries were re-equipped with four 18 pounders each.

The brigade was assigned to the 29th Division.  In March 1915, it embarked at Avonmouth  and sailed for Alexandria (via Malta) arriving from 28 March.  On 7 April, the division began re-embarking at Alexandria and sailed for Gallipoli.

Gallipoli
The division started landing at Cape Helles from 7am on 25 April and served on the Gallipoli Peninsula until January 1915.  While at Helles, the division saw action at the Capture of Sedd el Bahr (26 April), the First (28 April), Second (6–8 May) and Third Battles of Krithia (4 June), the Battle of Gully Ravine (28 June – 2 July) and the Battle of Krithia Vineyard (6–13 August).  From 16 August to the night of 19/20 December 1915, the bulk of the division served at Suvla but the brigade remained at Helles.  On the night of 7/8 January 1916, the division was evacuated from Helles.

The division moved to Egypt where it was concentrated at Suez.  In March 1916, it was transferred to France, landing at Marseille and reaching the Somme area (near Pont-Remy) between 15 and 29 March.  On 31 March, 369th Battery, RFA arrived from England and joined the brigade; it left for 132nd Brigade, RFA (29th Division) on 20 May.  The brigade remained on the Western Front for the rest of the war.

Western Front
The first action on the Western Front was the Battle of the Somme.  On 1 July 1916, the brigade took part in the Battle of Albert as part of VIII Corps, Fourth Army.

On 12 September 1916, the brigade was reorganized.  132nd Brigade, RFA was broken up and its three batteries were used to make up XV Brigade, RHA and 17th Brigade, RFA to six 18 pounders each.  At the same time, 460th (H) Battery, RFA (four 4.5" howitzers) joined the brigade from 17th Brigade, RFA.  It was made up to six howitzers on 19 January 1917.  The final change in organization occurred on 27 November 1916 when Y Battery was transferred to the 1st Cavalry Division and 1/1st Warwickshire Battery, RHA (TF) was received in exchange.

In 1917, the brigade supported the division in a large number of major actions including the Battle of Arras (April to May, First, Second and Third Battles of the Scarpe), the Third Battle of Ypres (August to October, battles of Langemarck, Brodseinde and Poelcappelle) and the Battle of Cambrai (November and December, including the Tank Attack and the German Counter-attacks).

1918 likewise saw a number of major actions, including the Battle of the Lys (April, the battles of Estaires, Messines, Hazelbrouck and Bailleul), the Advance to Victory (August and September) and the Final Advance in Flanders (September and October, Fifth Battle of Ypres and Battle of Courtrai).

At the Armistice, it was still serving with 29th Division with B Battery RHA, L Battery RHA, 1/1st Warwickshire Battery RHA (TF) and 460th (H) Battery RFA (eighteen 18 pounders and six 4.5" howitzers).

Dissolved
Still with 29th Division, the brigade advanced into Germany to take part in the Occupation of the Rhineland.  It left 29th Division in December 1918 and returned to England from Germany in April 1919.  The brigade was disbanded at this time.  460th (H) Battery was disbanded, 1/1st Warwickshire Battery, RHA (TF) was disembodied, B Battery joined I Brigade, RHA and L Battery joined VII Brigade, RHA, both in the United Kingdom.

See also

Notes

References

Bibliography

External links
The Royal Horse Artillery on The Long, Long Trail
29th Division on The Long, Long Trail
29th Division on the Regimental Warpath

Royal Horse Artillery brigades
Artillery units and formations of World War I
Military units and formations established in 1915
Military units and formations disestablished in 1919